Dodoma Region (Mkoa wa Dodoma in Swahili)  is one of Tanzania's 31 administrative regions. The regional capital is the city of Dodoma. The region is located in central Tanzania, it is bordered by Singida Region to the west; Manyara Region to the north; Iringa Region to the south; and Morogoro Region to the east. Dodoma Region hosts the nation's capital city with where the legislative assembly or Bunge is based. Dodoma Region also hosts one of the largest University in Tanzania, University of Dodoma. The region is sole home of the Tanzanian wine industry, which is the second largest wine industry on the continent after South Africa. According to the 2022 national census, the region had a population of 3,085,625. 2012 national census, where by, 2012 had 2,083,588.

History
Dodoma's name derives from the Gogo word, Idodomya, the location of an elephant's sinking.

The city of Dodoma where the region gets its name,  is the largest city and capital of the region, originally began as a small Gogo village in the early 19th century, consisting of several traditional tembe houses. The city was formally established in 1907 by German colonists during construction of the Tanzanian central railway. The region has a long history of famine and economic difficulties. Along with Kondoa and Singida it was struck hard by the famine of the 1910s. One report by a British officer in Dodoma in December 1916 reported that "The whole District has been ransacked for cattle". The Germans had killed 26,000 animals, and the British 5,659. The problems continued throughout 1917, and in November 1917 drought turned it into a crisis. Some 30,000, about 1 in 5 of the population of the district at the time died. Thousands of people emigrated, and others sold starving cattle for just a shilling at the market in Dodoma. Smallpox was prevalent, and a Spanish influenza epidemic killed an estimated 50,000–80,000 in Tanganyika between 1918 and 1920.

When the British took over the country, they favoured Dar es Salaam and Arusha, and the area began to decline in importance. The importance declined further in the 1960s when the Tanzam Highway was built by the Chinese, connecting Dar es Salaam to Morogoro and Iringa. On 9 December 1961, Tanganyika won independence from Britain, and Dodoma remained the capital of the Central Province. In 1963, the provinces of the new nation were divided into smaller administrative units and were renamed regions, and the Dodoma Region was established. However, in 1973, the Tanzanian government announced that the capital would be moved from Dar es Salaam to a more central location to better serve the needs of the people. Dodoma was selected for this purpose, as it was an already established town at a major crossroads with an agreeable climate and scope for development. The same year, the Tanzanian government launched a national soil conservation programme, known as the Dodoma Soil Conservation Programme, to improve soil fertility and productivity in the worst affected areas of the region.

Geography
Dodoma is the 8th largest region by area after Manyara Region. The region is bordered by the Manyara Region to the north, the Tanga Region to the north east, the Singida Region to the west, the Iringa Region to the south, and the Morogoro Region to the east and southeast.

About 413,110 hectares, or 2.5 percent of Tanzania's 885,987 square kilometer mainland, are in the Region. The distribution of the region's area across the districts favors Chamwino DC (19.5%) and Chemba DC (18.5%) more than Mpwapwa DC (18.1%), Bahi DC (14.4%), Kondoa DC (13.5%), Kondoa TC (1.1%), Kongwa DC (9.8%), and Dodoma CC, which is last (6.2 percent).

The Wami River Sub-Basin "extends from the semi-arid Dodoma Region to the humid inland swamps in the Morogoro Region to Saadani Village in the coastal Bagamoyo District", and the Kikuyu River also flows through the Region, flowing near the city of Dodoma itself. Protected areas include the Swaga Swaga Game Reserve. The region produces beans, seeds, grain, peanuts, coffee, tea, and tobacco. Cattle are also raised and marketed. A total of 220,989 hectares, or 5.44 percent of the region's 4,131,100 hectares of land, are covered by natural forest reserves. The majority of these natural forest reserves are in the Chamwino (100,391 hectares), Kondoa (37,199 hectares), Bahi (28,058 hectares), Mpwapwa (22,958 hectares), Kongwa (11,883 hectares), and Chemba regions (20,500 hectares).

Climate
Due to irregular and low rainfall, the Dodoma Region is primarily semi-arid. The most significant climatic characteristic in the area is rainfall. It occurs between November/December and April/May during a single rainy season. Usually, these storms bring strong rains that cause flash floods. In order for crops to thrive, about 60% of the rainwater runs off instead of soaking into the soil. The annual total of precipitation ranges from 500 to 800 mm. Although the temperature in the area varies depending on height, it typically ranges from around 15 °C in July to 30 °C in October. Additionally, there can be significant temperature changes between day and night, with scorching afternoons reaching temperatures of up to 35 °C and frigid nights reaching temperatures of around 10 °C.

Economy
In terms of socio-economic statistics, the Dodoma Region is ranked reasonably well. The region's Gross Domestic Product (GDP) was Tsh 2,635,574 million in 2015, and its GDP per capita was Tsh 1,188,343, according to the 2017 Tanzania Human Development Report (THDR). Dodoma received a Human Development Index1 (HDI) score of 0.479, placing it 17th out of 26 regions in mainland Tanzania. Tanzania's mainland has an average HDI score of 0.614. The life expectancy in Dodoma was 64.4 years longer than it was on the Tanzanian mainland (61.7 years).

Agriculture
The agriculture industry continues to dominate the economy of the Dodoma Region. There is subsistence farming as well as commercial farming. A total of 376,924 out of 450,305 private households in the area (equal to 84 percent) were involved in agriculture, according to the 2012 Population and Housing Census findings. These homes were primarily located in Chamwino District Council (68,162 households). The percentage of households engaged in agriculture in districts within the Dodoma Region ranged from 90% in Kondoa and Mpwapwa to 93 percent in Bahi and Chemba District Councils, with the exception of Dodoma City Council, where 54% of households were thus employed.

The Central Plateau zone, where the Dodoma Region is located, is well known for producing fruits like grapes, mango, papaya, guava, baobab, tamarind, and dates. The main cash crop grown by farmers among the fruits is grapes. Additionally, many farmers in Dodoma City and the adjacent districts of Chamwino and Bahi rely heavily on the production of grapes for their livelihood. Dodoma District produces over 70% of the grapes in the area. 30% of the output comes from Chamwino and Bahi. Jam, juice, jelly, wine, grape seed extracts, raisins, vinegar, and grapeseed oil are all products made from grapes. Smallholder farmers who grow grapes on their own farms are the main producers of grapes in Dodoma.

Maize, sorghum, millet, rice, pulses (mostly pigeon peas), cassava, potatoes, bananas, and plantains are some of the principal food crops grown in Dodoma. The area is part of the Central zone, which is primarily semi-arid and favors the production of paddy, sorghum, millet, and other oil-seed crops. The main food crops grown in the area are maize and sorghum, primarily in the districts of Kongwa, Chemba, Kondoa, Mpwapwa, and Chamwino. In terms of producing maize, Kongwa is the top district, followed by Kondoa and Chemba. Although crops like cassava and potatoes are only grown in tiny amounts, research reveals that they are more productive.

The second most important economic sector in the Dodoma Region is livestock farming. In Dodoman villages, livestock prevent malnutrition, produce revenue, and determine the economic and social standing of households. 99 percent of the cattle raised is of an indigenous type that does well in the local climate. The Tanzania Meat Company (TMC) and S&Y Gourmet were the two businesses in the area that processed livestock products in the fiscal year that ended in June 2017. TMC processed 1,400 tonnes of goat and sheep meat for export in addition to 6,562.5 tonnes of beef for domestic consumption. 250 tonnes of cattle and 90 tonnes of goats and sheep were processed for export alone by S & Y Gourmet. 250 tonnes of beef and 1,490 tonnes of processed sheep and goats were transported to Vietnam, Iraq, Morocco, and Oman.

Industry
After agriculture, service workers, shop and stall sales workers are the second-most significant occupation in the area, employing around 5.3% of the active population. The artisans, which account for 3.3% of the active population, rank in third. Technicians, Associate Professionals, and Livestock Keepers, which employ 3.0 percent and 2.3 percent of the region's population respectively, are the fourth and fifth economic activity in the area. The census data also reveal that although it is an informal industry, street sellers and related work are expanding quickly and are among the most important jobs in the region, accounting for 1.7% of the region's population aged 10 and over.

As of June 2018, the Dodoma Region had the following industries. There were 2,325 industries in the region, of which 1,262 (or 54% of the total) were engaged in the milling of maize, 436 (19%) in the processing of sunflower oil, 292 (or 13% of the total) in tailoring, 6 (or 0.3%) in the processing of wine, 45 (or 1.9%) in carpentry, and the remaining few were engaged in the production of various goods. Dodoma is home to more than 52 distinct types of minerals, but local miners have had difficulty extracting them due to a lack of funding and up-to-date technical know-how. These include the copper deposits in Tambi, Kimagai, and Kinusi in the Mpwapwa District; the nickel deposits at Haneti in the Chamwino District; the manganese deposits at Kibakwe in the Mpwapwa District; the silica; the enstatite in the Mpwapwa District; the scapolite (marialite-meionite) deposits at the Rubeho Mountains.

Infrastructure
The Dodoma Region is easily accessible all year round thanks to its good road infrastructure relative to the rest of the country. There is  efficient transfer of commodities to and from neighboring Regions. The majority of rural communities are well connected with year-round accessible roadways. The overall length of the region's road system is 8,183 km, of which 555 km are trunk highways, 1,142 km are regional roads, 3,054 km are district roads, and 3,432 km are village roads.

Dodoma Region is connected by paved trunk road (T3) that starts in Dar es Salaam on the coast, passes through Morogoro, Dodoma, and Singida, and ends at the Rwanda border. In 2016, a paved trunk road (T5) to Iringa was opened. The trunk road (T5) to Babati in Manyara Region was completed as of early 2018. Dodoma lies along the Great North Road, a major infrastructural network of Africa which connects Cairo to Cape Town.

The efficacy of the road network is measured by the condition of the roads during the rainy season. Dodoma Region is fortunate in that more than half (75.9%) of its total road network is either 510 km of asphalt or 1,565.2 km of gravel, both of which are open all year round, including during the rainy season.This is clear from Table 19, where passable roads are present for 2,490.1 Kilometres (50.0%) and 1,288.6 Kilometres (25.9%). The majority of the roads (1,098.1 kilometers) are in the Mpwapwa District, while tarmac roads span 110 kilometers.The smallest road network is in Kongwa, with 310 kilometers, and Chemba has the second-largest (971 kilometers).

Railways
There are 9 railway stations in the Dodoma Region, with the Kikombo, Ihumwa, Dodoma Urban, and Zuzu stations owned by the Dodoma City Council, the Bahi and Kigwe stations by the Bahi District, the Godegode Msagali and Gulwe stations by the Mpwapwa District, and the Igandu station by Chamwino.

The central railway of Tanzania passes through the city of Dodoma.

Airports
There is one airport and four air strips in the Dodoma Region. The airport is in the Dodoma City Council, and the air strips are in the following districts: Mpwapwa Town in Mpwawa, Mvumi Village in Chamwino, Kondoa Town in Kondoa, and Kongwa Village in Kongwa. These airstrips are utilized for emergency services like flood relief and pest control for crops like quelea quelea. Flying doctors that service Mvumi Mision District Designated Hospital also use the Mvumi Mision airstrip. The second airport in Dodoma is being built by the government in the Msalato area.

Communications
The Dodoma Region has access to the internet, landline and mobile phone telephone services, and postal services.The most fortunate area in the area is Dodoma Urban since it has easy access to the aforementioned telecommunications services. Additionally, there are three television cable stations—Dodoma TV Cable, Maneno TV Cable, and FCN TV—as well as ten radio stations—Dodoma FM, Mwangaza FM, ABM FM, Nyemo FM, Kifimbo FM, Maisha FM, A- FM, RAS FM, Impact FM, and Uzima Radio—that broadcast from Dodoma City. Famous Tanzanian local television networks include Tanzania Broadcasting Corporation (TBC) Television, Independent Television (ITV), Star TV, Azam TV, Clouds 360 TV, and Channel Ten can be accessed.

A number of telephone providers, including Tanzania Telecommunication Company Limited (TTCL), Vodacom, Airtel, Tigo, Zantel, Halotel, and optical fiber network, provide excellent service to the area. All of these companies, or a select handful of them, service the majority of urban and rural areas.

Tourism
The Dodoma Region is blessed with a variety of tourist attractions, such as two game reserves (Swagaswaga Game Reserve and Mkugunero Game Reserve) where regulated hunting is permitted. Kidolea Game Reserve is another game reserve but hunting is prohitbited. Historical sites are found in the region including locations where freedom fighters from Mozambique, Zambia, Namibia, and South Africa stayed while training for their nations' independence.Dodoma is home to one of the nationsl UNESCO World Heritage site the Kondoa Rock-Art Sites in Kondoa District.

Population 
The Dodoma Region is the ancestral homeland to the following people groups; Gogo, Rangi, Sandawe & Burungi.

Demographics 
According to the 2022 national census, the region had a population of 2,083,588. The Region represented 4.8 percent of the total population of Tanzania Mainland which was 43,625,354 in 2012. In 2012, it was the seventeenth most densely populated region with 50 people per square kilometer. Dodoma District has the largest population at 410,956 in 2012. According to NBS's (2018) population forecasts, Dodoma had a total population of 2,312,141 in 2017, of which 1,126,309 were men and 1,185,833 were women. Annual population growth is 2.1 percent on average.

Administrative divisions

Districts
Dodoma Region is divided into seven districts, each administered by a council:
(Kondoa, Chemba, Bahi, Dodoma, Chamwino, Kongwa, and Mpwapwa), eight local government authorities, 29 divisions, 209 wards, 607 villages, 181 streets, and 2,184 hamlets. Other districts each have a council, however the Kondoa District has a Kondoa Town Council and a Kondoa District Council.

Health and Education
Dodoma is the centre of educational activity in the region, with two universities as of 2009. Established in 2007, in coordination with Tanzania's Development Vision 2025, the University of Dodoma is expected to have some 50,000 students when fully functional. more than double the size of the University of Dar es Salaam. The university had an expected enrollment of 40,000 in 2012, five years after opening. The second university is the St. John's University of Tanzania.

Notable persons from Dodoma Region
 John Malecela, 6th Tanzanian Prime Minister

References
{{Reflist=

}}

External links

 

 
Regions of Tanzania